The LT vz. 34, formally designated as Lehký tank vzor 34 ("Light Tank Mark 34") was a Czechoslovak-designed light tank used mainly by Slovakia during World War II. Its suspension was based on that of the Carden-Loyd tankette, of which the Czechs had purchased three, plus a manufacturing license, in 1930. Dissatisfied with the prototypes of the Tančík vz. 33 tankette, the Czech Army decided that it would be easier to design a light tank from scratch rather than modify a tankette's chassis to carry a fully rotating armored turret. 50 were built, the last of which was delivered during 1936, of which the Germans captured 22 - including the prototype, when they occupied Bohemia-Moravia in March 1939, but they promptly scrapped them. The Slovaks seized the remaining 27 when they declared independence from Czechoslovakia at the same time. In Slovak service it only saw combat during the Slovak National Uprising.

Description 
The LT vz. 34 was assembled from a framework of steel "angle iron" beams, to which armor plates were riveted. A  firewall separated the engine compartment from the crew. A door allowed access to the engine from the crew compartment. It also had ventilation openings that could be closed. The driver sat on the right side using a  observation port protected by two flaps. The inner flap had an episcope with a 25° field of view. It was connected to the armored outer flap so that opening one closed the other. The outer flap had a 3 mm slit. The inner flap was padded so that the driver could rest his head on it when driving. The radio operator sat on the left and had his own  vision port with 50 mm of bulletproof glass and an armored shutter. His radios were mounted on the left wall of the hull. The hull machine gun was between the driver and radio operator in a ball mount with 30° of traverse. It could elevate 25° and depress 10°. Most of the machine gun's barrel protruded from the mount and was protected by an armored trough. The mount had a spotting telescope or open sights could be used if the plug at the top of the ball mount was removed. If necessary the driver could lock the mount into position and fire it himself using a Bowden cable.

The turret was manually traversed (3° per rotation of the handle), but the gearing could be disengaged to allow the commander to shoulder the turret around as desired. The turret had a flat face in the center of which was mounted the  main armament. On the right side was another  machine gun in a ball mount. The commander had four episcopes in his cupola and a monocular mirror, 1.3 × 35° periscope which he could extend once he removed its armored cover in his hatch for vision while "buttoned-up". This meant that the commander was responsible for loading, aiming and firing the main gun and the turret machine gun while simultaneously commanding the tank.

The , water-cooled, inline 4-cylinder Praga engine used a gasoline-alcohol mix. One  fuel tank was located on each side of the engine. The transmission had four forward gears and one reverse gear to drive the front-mounted drive sprockets.

The suspension was an enlarged and modified version of that used in the Carden-Loyd tankettes. It consisted of two small road wheels fastened together on a frame, two frames paired and sprung by leaf springs that made a wheel carrier, two wheel carriers per side. The track was guided by two return rollers and wooden, metal-lined frames. The rear-mounted idler wheel was used to adjust track tension. It had a ground pressure of only .

The main armament was a Škoda ÚV vz. 34 (A3) gun with a pepperpot muzzle brake and a prominent armored recoil cylinder above the barrel. The machine gun's ball mount could be coupled to the main gun or used independently. Both weapons could elevate 25° and depress 10°. They both used 1.25× power sights with a 25° field of view. The tank used Zbrojovka Brno ZB vz. 35 heavy machine guns in both ball mounts.

Development 
One prototype was ordered from Českomoravská Kolben-Daněk in 1931, but development was slow and it was accepted only in November 1932. Its evaluations were very positive and an order for fifty was placed on 19 April 1933. The first six of these were to serve as pre-production models and were to be delivered by 30 September 1933. The delivery date for the next batch of twenty-four was a year after that and the final batch of twenty was due by 30 July 1935. Production was delayed by quality problems with the initial batch of armor plates from Poldi and delivery of the pre-production series did not occur until 23 April 1934. A bigger problem was that the Army had rejected ČKD's proposed armament of a  Vickers 44/60 gun and two ZB vz. 26 machine guns so the contract was signed with no design work on the desired armament configuration. ČKD did not finalize its design until December 1933 and the first six tanks were delivered with only a pair of ZB vz. 26 machine guns. The last tanks were delivered on 14 January 1936, but the six pre-production models had to be returned to the factory to be upgraded with the proper armament and otherwise modified up to the latest standards. The last one was delivered on 17 August 1936.

Operational history

Czechoslovakia

The Czechoslovak Army realized that the 15 mm armor on its LT vz. 34 tanks was too thin and a program to replace it was quickly mounted which resulted in the LT vz. 35. In the meantime they offered the Army an opportunity to train with more modern tanks than its few surviving World War I-era Renault FTs. Each of the three armored regiments received between 9 and 24 tanks until replaced by the LT vz. 35 from 1937. After the Munich Agreement in October 1938 the army tried to sell them, but could find no takers. In November 1938 it decided to concentrate all of them in the Third Armored Regiment in Slovakia, but only eighteen had been transferred before the German occupation of Czechoslovakia and the Slovak declaration of independence in March 1939.

Germany
The Germans captured 22 LT vz. 34s - plus the prototype, when they occupied Czechoslovakia, but there is no record of their use so they were presumably quickly scrapped. Ten LT vz. 34s were captured after they were abandoned by the insurgents during the Slovak National Uprising in 1944. They were shipped to Škoda Works for repairs, but the local military representative ordered them scrapped because of their poor condition and obsolescence. The Waffen-SS tried to overturn this order as it planned to transfer them to Nazi puppet state of Croatia. Two were saved from the scrapyard, but by March 1945 the others had their turrets salvaged to be rearmed with two machine guns and mounted in fixed fortifications.

Hungary
Hungary captured one LT vz. 34 in Carpatho-Ukraine on 15 March 1939, when it conquered that country. Impressed, the Hungarians asked Škoda for a quote to repair it. The Hungarians did not accept the price, but Škoda fixed it for free once the Hungarians had bought a license to build the medium T-21 tank in August 1940. It was returned to Hungary in March 1941 and were used for training through 1943.

Slovakia
The 27 LT vz. 34s (including 9 LT vz. 34 light tanks which the Czechs had evacuated from Carpatho-Ukraine to Humene and Prešov) formed one company in the Armored Battalion "Martin" formed by the Slovak Army in mid-1939, which was later expanded into the Armored Regiment, but they were relegated to training duties once the Slovaks began to receive more modern tanks from Germany in 1941. Ten were abandoned by the insurgents when the Slovak National Uprising began in September 1944 and were quickly captured by the Germans. The others were dug in on the approaches to Zvolen.

See also 

 Comparison of early World War II tanks

Notes

References

External links
 Slovak vehicles on Tanks!
 Útočná vozba - LT vz.34

Light tanks of the interwar period
Light tanks of Czechoslovakia
Cavalry tanks
World War II light tanks
Military vehicles introduced in the 1930s